The 1923–24 Swiss International Ice Hockey Championship was the ninth edition of the international ice hockey championship in Switzerland. HC Château-d'Oex won the championship by defeating HC Davos in the final.

First round

Eastern Series 
 EHC St. Moritz - HC Davos 2:1

Since EHC St. Moritz was unable to participate in the finals, their place was taken by HC Davos.

Western Series

Group 1

Group 2

Final 
 HC Château-d'Oex - HC Bellerive Vevey 4:2

Final 
The final was played on January 20, 1924, in Gstaad.

 HC Château-d'Oex - HC Davos 3:2

External links 
Swiss Ice Hockey Federation – All-time results

Inter
Swiss International Ice Hockey Championship seasons